The North Macedonia national football team represents North Macedonia in men's international football, and is administered by the Football Federation of Macedonia. The team play their home matches at the Toše Proeski National Arena in Skopje.

North Macedonia have been rising in football in recent years, reaching Euro 2020 (their first major tournament) and the European qualifying play-off final of the 2022 World Cup (after defeating Italy in Palermo).

History
The National team was represented within the Federal team since 1919.
Between 1945 and 1992, SR Macedonia was ineligible to play as a team for official matches. The team had mostly played exhibition matches against teams from other republics of SFR Yugoslavia and was represented by Macedonian players under the traditional red, yellow and white colors.
As an independent team, it started to compete on international level after the split of the federation in 1991.

Early years (1993–96)

In 1994, the Republic of Macedonia became a single member of FIFA and UEFA after the independence and split of the Yugoslavia. They recorded their first match as a 4–1 victory against Slovenia in a friendly on 13 October 1993 under coach Andon Dončevski.

They went on to win their next two friendlies against Slovenia and Estonia.

Euro 1996 qualifiers

The Euro '96 qualifiers was the first major qualifying tournament that Macedonia participated in as an independent nation,  grouped with Spain, Denmark, Belgium, Cyprus and Armenia. In their opening game, which was also their first ever official match, Macedonia played the reigning European champions Denmark, finishing 1–1 after Macedonia led for most of the game. In Euro '96 qualifying, Macedonia suffered one of its worst-ever defeats, 5–0 to Belgium on 7 June 1995. They failed to qualify for Euro '96, finishing fourth in the group with seven points.

Hadžievski, Kanatlarovski and Jovanovski's era (1996–2001)

1998 World Cup qualifiers

Macedonia's first qualifying attempt for the World Cup saw them grouped with Romania, Republic of Ireland, Lithuania, Iceland, and Liechtenstein.

The tournament began on 24 April 1996 with a 3–0 win at home against Liechtenstein. On 9 November 1996, Macedonia recorded their biggest  ever, an 11–1 thrashing of Liechtenstein. Macedonia defeated the Republic of Ireland 3–2 at home, their first win over a major European team, but failed again to qualify for the 1998 World Cup in France, finishing fourth in the group on 13 points.

Euro 2000 qualifiers

Macedonia's journey to qualify for the Euro 2000 tournament in the Netherlands and Belgium saw them grouped with FR Yugoslavia, Republic of Ireland, Croatia, and Malta. They once again opened their qualifying campaign with a win after beating Malta 4–0 at home on 6 September 1998. Their most notable result in the campaign was a 1–1 draw against Croatia in June 1999, with an equalizer of Gjorgji Hristov 10 minutes before the end of the game. They helped Yugoslavia to qualify directly and eliminate Croatia because they drew 1–1 against the Republic of Ireland with a last-minute equalizer of Goran Stavrevski. However, they failed to qualify again, finishing fourth in the group with eight points.

2002 World Cup qualifiers

Macedonia's 2002 World Cup qualifying campaign saw them grouped with Sweden, Turkey, Slovakia, Moldova, and Azerbaijan. They were unsuccessful in their opening match, going down to Slovakia 2–0 in Bratislava on 3 September 2000. The Macedonians once again failed to qualify for the 2002 World Cup as they finished fourth in the group with seven points.

Ups and downs (2001–06)

Euro 2004 qualifiers

The Euro 2004 Qualifiers saw Macedonia grouped alongside England, Turkey, Slovakia, and Liechtenstein.
Macedonia played England in Southampton, England's first home game in Southampton in almost 100 years. Macedonia grabbed the lead early in the first half after Artim Šakiri scored directly from a corner kick. England soon leveled the game, before Macedonia led again. The game eventually ended 2–2. Macedonia lost to England 2–1 at home in the return leg, which took place in September 2003. Macedonia's only win of the campaign came on 7 June 2003, when they beat Liechtenstein 3–1 at home.

2006 World Cup qualifiers

Macedonia was drawn in Group 1 and was grouped with the Netherlands, Czech Republic, Romania, Finland, Armenia, and Andorra. They managed to open their campaign with a comfortable 3–0 win at home against Armenia on 18 August 2004. Macedonia did not win another home game for more than three years.

On 9 October 2004, Macedonia managed to hold the Netherlands to a surprise 2–2 draw in Skopje in front of a crowd of 17,000 at the Skopje City Stadium, but just four days later, they suffered a 1–0 loss away to Andorra. Macedonia then set a new team record for most goals conceded in a game when they lost 6–1 away to the Czech Republic in June 2005.

Macedonia went on to concede a further eight goals in the next two qualifying games, both against Finland. On 23 August 2005, coach Slobodan Santrač resigned as coach of Macedonia after just five months due to personal problems, with former player Boban Babunski temporarily taking over as coach. The resignation came just days after they were beaten 3–0 by Finland in Skopje. Despite failing to qualify for the 2006 World Cup, Macedonia was the only team in the group to not lose against the Netherlands.

Iran tournament
Following the completion of the 2006 World Cup qualifying tournament, in November 2005, Macedonia took part in a friendly tournament in Iran consisting of four teams: Macedonia, Iran, Paraguay, and Togo. In their opening match, they won 2–1 against host nation Iran, booking a spot in the final against Paraguay, where they lost 1–0.

Srečko Katanec's era and best FIFA ranking (2006–10)

Euro 2008 qualifiers

On 17 February 2006, former Slovenian national team coach Srečko Katanec was appointed as the head coach and was given a two-year contract.

In the lead-up to the beginning of the qualifiers for Euro 2008, Macedonia managed two wins in friendlies, against Ecuador 2–1 in Madrid, and 1–0 Turkey. Macedonia was placed in Group E for the Euro 2008 qualifiers alongside England, Croatia, Russia, Israel, Estonia, and Andorra.

Macedonia opened its UEFA Euro 2008 qualifying campaign with a 1–0 win away to Estonia on 16 August 2006. Macedonia hosted England on 6 September in their second game of the qualifiers. England went on to win 1–0; this was the first time that Macedonia failed to score against England.

A month later, on 7 October 2006, the two teams met once again in Manchester, where England was held to a 0–0 draw in front of 72,062 people. On 17 October 2007, Macedonia recorded their first win on home soil since August 2004 when they defeated Andorra 3–0 in Skopje.

Macedonia then recorded one of their most impressive wins to date when they picked up a 2–0 victory over eventual group winners Croatia on 17 November 2007; it was also a first win for Macedonia over a side that was ranked in the top ten of the FIFA World Rankings. Despite this, Macedonia failed to qualify for Euro 2008 after finishing fifth in the group with 14 points.

2010 World Cup qualifiers

On 25 November 2007, just days after Macedonia completed its qualifying campaign for Euro 2008, the groups for European qualifiers for the 2010 World Cup were held in Durban, South Africa, where Macedonia was seeded in Pot 4 and grouped along with the Netherlands, Scotland, Norway and Iceland. Manager Srečko Katanec received a two-year extension on 21 December 2007, which meant he would be under contract through the end of the 2010 World Cup qualifiers. In the lead up to the campaign, Macedonia played three friendlies against Serbia, Bosnia and Herzegovina and Poland, which all ended in draws.

Macedonia opened their campaign with a 1–0 home win against Scotland on 6 September 2008 when Ilčo Naumoski scored on a rebound after a missed free-kick by Goce Sedloski. Following these impressive results, Macedonia moved up 10 places to 46 in the FIFA World Rankings list for October 2008 which was their highest ever ranking. Srečko Katanec left the team following a 4–0 loss to the Netherlands in Amsterdam in April 2009 for allegedly getting into an argument with Goran Pandev.

Soon afterward, the manager of the under-21 squad, Mirsad Jonuz, became the new coach of the Macedonian senior team and was signed until the end of the World Cup qualifying campaign. On 12 August 2009, a friendly match against Spain was held at the newly built City Park Stadium in Skopje. The defending European champions won 3–2 after being 2–0 down at halftime. In September, Macedonia lost 2–0 to Scotland and then to Norway; Macedonia missed the World Cup again.

Fall and resurgence (2010–2018)

Euro 2012 qualifiers

On 7 February 2010, Macedonia was placed in Group B for the Euro 2012 qualifiers alongside Russia, Slovakia, Republic of Ireland, Armenia and Andorra. In the lead up to the qualifiers, an under-strength Macedonia side played friendlies against Azerbaijan, Romania, and Malta, winning the first two 3–1 and 1–0 respectively, and tied 1–1 against Malta later the summer.

Macedonia finished in fifth in the group with only two wins against minnows Andorra and two draws, against Armenia and Slovakia, both at home. Manager Mirsad Jonuz was dismissed on 18 June 2011 and replaced by John Toshack.

2014 World Cup qualifiers

Macedonia's 2014 World Cup qualifying campaign saw them grouped with Croatia, Serbia, Belgium, Scotland and Wales. In August 2012, prior to the qualifications, John Toshack would leave as manager and would be replaced by Čedomir Janevski.  The national team would begin the qualification round with a loss to Croatia in Zagreb and would go on to draw against Scotland in Glasgow. They lost again to Croatia and won against Serbia in Skopje after a penalty kick taken by Agim Ibraimi. Later in qualification, the national team would go on to lose twice to the eventual group winners Belgium.

Macedonia would win against Wales and lose against Scotland at home. Around the end of September 2013, Janevski would leave the team for Belgian club R.A.E.C. Mons and would be replaced by Zoran Stratev for the last two matches. Away losses to Wales and Serbia meant they would finish last in their group.

After the qualification run, Goran Pandev, Nikolče Noveski, Veliče Šumulikoski and others would retire from the national team due to turbulent relations with the Football Federation of Macedonia. In November 2013, Boško Gjurovski would be appointed the new national team manager.

Euro 2016 qualifiers

On 23 February 2014, Macedonia was placed in Group C for the Euro 2016 qualifiers alongside Spain, Ukraine, Slovakia, Belarus and Luxembourg. With 5–1 loss to Spain in Valencia, the only win they collected was against Luxembourg in Skopje.

After that match, Macedonia was brought into a run of a four losses; manager Boško Gjurovski was dismissed on 7 April 2015 and replaced by Ljubinko Drulović. Further losses ensued against Slovakia and surprisingly Luxembourg by late goal of Sébastien Thill.

In the last match against Belarus in Barysaw, Macedonia played a draw that broke the streak of seven losses. The team still ended qualification last of the group.

2018 World Cup qualifiers

On 25 July 2015, in the middle of the Euro 2016 qualifying, the group draws for European qualifiers for the 2018 World Cup were held in Saint Petersburg. Macedonia was seeded in Pot 5 and grouped along with Spain again, for the first time with Italy, along with Albania, Israel and Liechtenstein.

In October 2015, Drulović left the national team to join Serbian club Partizan and the manager place was taken over by the former manager of Rabotnički, Igor Angelovski. That same month, 2010 UEFA Champions League champion Goran Pandev came back to the national team after two years of absence.

Macedonia started with another disappointing performance with a loss to Albania in Shkodër, with a goal scored by Bekim Balaj in the last moments of the game, in a match that was played over two days because of interruption in the 76th minute due to weather. Later on they also lost to Israel at home after missing a penalty kick by Adis Jahović. After that, the national team also lost to Italy beside their 2–1 lead with the goals scored by Ilija Nestorovski and Ferhan Hasani. At the end of 2016, Macedonia was outclassed by Spain in Granada 4–0; Macedonia had not scored a single point, the worst qualifying start in the history of the national team.

Finally, in March 2017, Macedonia recorded their first win in qualifying against Liechtenstein, 3–0. Then they lost to Spain in Skopje 2–1. They also defeated Israel away through the lone goal by Goran Pandev, which was also a first ever win against Israel. Macedonia later tied Albania in Strumica 1–1.

2018–present

2018–19 UEFA Nations League D

In the first edition of the UEFA Nations League, Macedonia played in League D, the lowest division. Macedonia were drawn in Group 4 with Armenia, Liechtenstein and Gibraltar. The national team won the group with five wins and one loss, and were promoted to the League C for the next edition of the Nations League. North Macedonia were assured of a UEFA Euro 2020 qualifying play-offs place.

Euro 2020 qualifiers

For UEFA Euro 2020 qualifying North Macedonia were placed in Group G, along with Austria, Israel, Latvia, Poland and Slovenia. North Macedonia managed two first impressive results, drawing Slovenia 1–1 away and before that, defeated Latvia 3–1 at home,. However, North Macedonia would soon fall 1–0 to Poland and 4–1 to Austria. Then, the recently renamed country recorded a 1–1 away draw to Israel, and a 2–1 win over Slovenia at home. North Macedonia then lost 2–0 away to Poland, and 2–1 away to Austria, ending up in third place.

However, due to having successfully taken first place in the UEFA Nations League earlier, North Macedonia was able to reach the country's first ever competitive playoff in history and was scheduled against Kosovo. Eventually, in the UEFA Euro 2020 qualifying play-offs first game, North Macedonia overcame Kosovo 2–1 at home. Then they faced Georgia in the final of Path D's play-offs on 13 November, winning 1–0.

2020–21 UEFA Nations League C

After winning the League D group in the first edition of the UEFA Nations League, North Macedonia were promoted to the third division of the competition, League C. North Macedonia was drawn in Group 2 together with Armenia, Estonia and Georgia.

UEFA Euro 2020

North Macedonia made their Euros debut in 2020, postponed to 2021 due to the COVID-19 pandemic. All three Group C matches ended up in a loss, to Austria, Ukraine and the Netherlands; Goran Pandev equalized against Austria in the 28th minute and Ezgjan Alioski scored against Ukraine. North Macedonia was the second debutant, after Finland.

 13 June 2021 at Arena Națională, Bucharest: Austria 3–1 North Macedonia
 17 June 2021 at Arena Națională, Bucharest: Ukraine 2–1 North Macedonia
 21 June 2021 at Johan Cruyff Arena, Amsterdam: North Macedonia 0–3 Netherlands

2022 World Cup qualifiers
For the 2022 World Cup qualifying campaign, North Macedonia was drawn in Group J with Germany, Romania, Iceland, Armenia and Liechtenstein. On matchday 3, North Macedonia inflicted a 2–1 defeat on Germany in Duisburg, which was Germany's first World Cup qualification defeat since 2001 and only the third in their history. In the last two games against Armenia and Iceland, North Macedonia won both (5–0 away against Armenia, 3–1 against Iceland) to put them in 2nd in Group J. Qualifying for the play-offs, they defeated reigning European champions Italy in Palermo on 24 March 2022, and faced Portugal in the play-off final on 29 March where they lost 2-0.

2022–23 UEFA Nations League C

North Macedonia had played in the UEFA Nations League against Bulgaria, Gibraltar, and Georgia, and ended up in third place.

Team image

Stadiums

Kit sponsorship

Recent results and upcoming fixtures

2022

2023

Players

Current squad
 The following players were called up for the Euro 2024 qualifying match against  and the friendly match against  on 23 and 27 March 2023.

 Caps and goals are correct as of 20 November 2022, after the match against Azerbaijan.

Recent call-ups
The following players have been called up for the team within the last 12 months and are still available for selection.

Notes
INJ = Withdrew due to injury
PRE = Preliminary squad / standby
RET = Retired from the national team
SUS = Serving suspension
U21 = Player called up to the U21 squad.
COV = The player is not part of the current squad due to being tested positive for COVID-19
WD = Player withdrew from the squad due to non-injury issue.

Statistics

Players in bold are still active with Macedonia.

Most appearances

Top goalscorers

Captains
This is a list of Macedonian captains for five or more official and friendly matches.

Note: Some of the other players to have captained the team include: Dragi Kanatlarovski (1 cap; 1993), Ilija Najdoski (3; 1994), Dančo Celeski (2; 1995), Ljupčo Markovski (4; 1995 to 1997), Mitko Stojkovski (2; 1998), Boban Babunski (2; 1996 and 1999), Gjorgji Hristov (2; 2002 to 2003), Petar Miloševski (2; 2004 and 2008), Ilcho Naumoski (1; 2008), Igor Mitreski (4; 2007 to 2010), Aleksandar Lazevski (1; 2010), Nikolče Noveski (4; 2011 to 2013), Daniel Mojsov (1; 2012), Boban Grncharov (3; 2012 to 2014), Blazhe Ilijoski (1; 2014), Blagoja Todorovski (1; 2014), Vanche Shikov (4; 2015), Ivan Trichkovski (4; 2018 to 2020), Ilija Nestorovski (1; 2019) and Darko Velkovski (1; 2022).

Coaching history
Updated on 17 November 2022

Competitive record

FIFA World Cup

UEFA European Championship

Olympic Record 
Within Yugoslavia Team
1920 Round 1, 1924 Preliminary, 1928 Preliminary, 1948(2nd), 1952(2nd), 1956 (2nd), 1960 Champion, 1964 1/4 finals, 1980(4th), 1984(3rd),1988 group
Since 1996 under 21 team plays at Olympics 
1996 couldn't participate 
2000-2020 didn't qualify

UEFA Nations League

Minor tournaments
 Yugoslav Football Tournament
 5th place: 1945

 Team Macedonia Rustenov, Bogojevski, Vidovik, Martinovski, Petrovski, Davidovski, Janevski, Adamovski, Atanaskov, Balevski, Gerov. Manager:  Illes Spitz

Head-to-head record
, after the match against Azerbaijan.

FIFA ranking history
FIFA-ranking yearly averages for North Macedonia. The country reached 46th in October 2008, and 166th in March 2017. As of 25 March 2022, they sit in 66th.

See also

List of  Macedonia international footballers
 Macedonia national football team results
 Macedonia national under-21 football team
 Macedonia national under-19 football team
 Macedonia national under-17 football team
 Macedonia women's national football team

Notes

References

External links

Official website 
Macedonia at FIFA 
Macedonia at UEFA
Macedonian Football
Fans forum 
Macedonia– International Results 1993– RSSSF

 
European national association football teams
Football in North Macedonia